Kvemo Chala ( — the lower dell) is a village in Georgia, in Kaspi Municipality.  It is the center of Theme (Villages: Akhalsheni, Gamdlistskaro, Goraka, Vake, Pantiani, Sakorintlo). The village is situated on a plain, on the middle stream of Lekhura river. The village was the home of the Karbelashvili brothers and their father Grigol. The last family castle of Amilakhvari dukes is also found in the village.

Demography

See also
 Shida Kartli

Notes

Sources
 Georgian Soviet Encyclopedia, p. 517, Tb., 1986

Populated places in Shida Kartli